Childish Things is a 2005 album by singer-songwriter James McMurtry.

Childish Things may also refer to:

Literature
 A well-known verse from the Bible's New Testament
 Childish Things, a play by British playwright Alan Wilkins
 Childish Things, a 2001 novel by Scottish writer Robin Jenkins
 "Childish Things", a 1994 short story by American writer Bud Sparhawk
 "Childish Things", a 1993 story in the graphic-novel series Torsobear by Brett Uren
 "Childish Things", a 1993 volume of a Star Trek spinoff comic-book series

Media
 Childish Things (film), an American 1969 film
 "Childish Things" (Deadwood episode), an episode of the American TV series 
 "Childish Things" (Supergirl), an episode of the American TV series 
 "Childish Things", an episode of the American TV series Eagle Riders
 "Childish Things", an episode of Adventures in Odyssey, an American radio show

Music
 Childish Things, annual charity performances including the British band Out of the Blue
 "Childish Things", a song on the 2006 album Sugar Queen by Northern Irish singer-songwriter Brian Houston
 "Childish Things", a song by Sweet Comfort Band on their 1977 self-titled album

Other
 Childish Things, developers of the International Cricket Captain (series) of video games

See also
 Monsters and Other Childish Things, a 2007 role-playing game